Lone Mountain is a summit in the U.S. state of Nevada.

Lone Mountain was so named on account of its isolated location relative to other summits in the area.

References

Mountains of Eureka County, Nevada